Cornerstone Florida was an annual American Christian rock festival held in Orlando, Florida, from 2003 to 2007, a satellite festival of the original Cornerstone Festival in Illinois. It was one of the twenty-five festivals recognized by the Christian Festival Association. It has hosted such bands as Relient K, Kutless, Anberlin, and Family Force 5. In addition to hosting national bands on the main stages, it also allowed for local Christian bands in the area (and from around the state) to perform on side stages for the passing crowds to see and experience.

Starting during the 2004 festival, Cornerstone Florida made an emphasis on doing more than music as they introduced worship and seminar stages for those in attendance who were interested. Groups like Chris Tomlin, Shane and Shane, and others were featured. Although the worship-only stage was removed during the 2005-2007 festivals, worship leaders such as David Crowder were still prevalent and signed to play.

Demise
On December 10, 2007 it was announced on the Cornerstone Florida website that there would be no Cornerstone Florida in 2008, and no indication of a return of a Florida festival event.

2007 Bands

Main Stages

As I Lay Dying
August Burns Red
Between The Trees
Chasing Victory
Copeland
The Chariot
Derek Webb
Gasoline Heart
The Satire
Seventh Star
Underoath
The Wiitala Brothers
Jonezetta
Charlie Hall
Fireflight
Kids in the Way
Showbread (This was Ivory's last show with the band)
Maylene and the Sons of Disaster
The Almost
Cool Hand Luke
As Cities Burn
The Dark Romantics
Over the Rhine
Play Radio Play
Family Force 5
Anchor & Braille
Haste The Day

Showcase Stages

Brian Jones
Brimstone Flavored Candy
Broken
Castaway
Cripple
Entyne
Evangelin
Eversfield
Flowers For The Dead
From The Throne
Gamera! The Invincible
In Loving Memory
Martyr's Prayer
Me At My Darkest
Mighty Tight Whities
Officer Flossie
One Last Rose
Parker City Limit
Procella
Public Display of Affection (PDA)
Red Letter Bullet
Regret and Forgive Again
Riley vs Aubrey
Ripe
Risen Above Ashes
Riverdale
Robots and Butterflies
Rock Solid
Send Out Scuds
Shake Azalia
Skyliner
Standing By Grace
Starlume
Start It Over
The Black Regiment
The Fat Guys In Tank Tops!!
The Love Affair
The Promise Drive
The Red Baron
The Scarlet Farewell
The Vow
The Wolverines
These Arms of Faith
Thirsty
Tim Serdynski
Went Down In Glory
While You Were Gone
York

2006 Bands

Friday, May 12

Stage 1:

David Crowder Band
Hawk Nelson
Falling Up
The Wiitala Brothers
Andrew Phillip

Stage 2:

Relient K
Kutless
Kids in the Way
House of Heroes
Chasing Victory

Indoor Stage:

Project 86
Haste the Day
Seventh Star
Anam Cara
Pigeon John
LA Symphony
Fireflight
For Daylight
Bernard

Showcase Stage:

Across Five Aprils (band)
Prying Eyes
Sullivan
The Promise Drive
Change 58

Saturday, May 13
Stage 1:

Copeland
The Chariot
The Rocket Summer
Brandtson
Showbread
Spitfire
Gasoline Heart
Jonezetta
Transition

Stage 2:

Underoath
As Cities Burn
Cool Hand Luke
John Fischer (Speaker)
The Showdown
The Satire
Paramore
The Myriad
The Lonely Hearts

Indoor Stage:

Anberlin
Lovedrug
Glenn Kaiser Band
Sleeping at Last
Family Force 5
Denison Witmer
Band Marino
John Davis
Anathallo
The Dark Romantics
The Class of 98
Ezekiel's Eye

External links
Cornerstone Florida: Official Website 
HM Magazine coverage, Cornerstone Florida 2003

2000s in Orlando, Florida
Christianity in Orlando, Florida
2003 establishments in Florida
2007 disestablishments in Florida
Music festivals in Orlando, Florida
Rock festivals in the United States
Recurring events disestablished in 2007
Defunct music festivals
Christian music festivals
Music festivals established in 2003